The Chase Fieldhouse is a 2,500-seat multi-purpose arena and sports complex in Wilmington, Delaware, United States. The arena, home to the NBA G League team the Delaware Blue Coats who are the affiliate of the Philadelphia 76ers, hosted its first game on January 23, 2019. Construction on the remainder of the complex was completed in April 2019.

History
On November 29, 2017 the Philadelphia 76ers and Harris Blitzer Sports & Entertainment announced plans for 76ers Fieldhouse.

The facility opened in January 2019, with NBA G League games in the 2018–19 season. On September 20, 2019 ESPN aired an episode of the sports talk series First Take at the 76ers Fieldhouse.

On February 18, 2021, JPMorgan Chase bought the naming rights. 

In 2023, it hosted the Atlantic 10 women's basketball championship.

Features
 Three NBA size basketball courts
 One indoor  turf field for soccer 
 One outdoor  turf field with lighting for soccer 
 Performance and training facility 
 Retail and office space

See also 
 Philadelphia 76ers Training Complex

References

External links
 Official Site

Basketball venues in Delaware
Delaware Blue Coats
Indoor soccer venues in the United States
NBA G League venues
Soccer venues in Delaware